From 1906 to 1926, the Finnish Swimming Federation did not arrange a dedicated national competition, but spread out the hosting duties of the championship events to multiple clubs.

Diving

Men

Plain 
Competed in Tampere on 13 August 1911.

Source:

Platform 
Competed in Tampere on 13 August 1911.

Source:

Springboard 
Competed in Helsinki on 6 August 1911.

Source:

Women

Platform 
Competed in Vaasa on 29 July 1911.

Source:

Swimming

Men

100 metre freestyle 
Competed in Tampere on 12 August 1911.

Source:

500 metre freestyle 
Competed in Vaasa on 30 July 1911.

Source:

1000 metre freestyle 
Competed in Helsinki on 6 August 1911.

Source:

100 metre backstroke 
Competed in Vaasa on 29 July 1911.

Source:

200 metre breaststroke 
Competed in Tampere on 12–13 August 1911.

Source:

100 metre life saving 
Competed in Helsinki on 6 August 1911.

Source:

4 × 50 metre freestyle relay 
Competed in Helsinki on 5–6 August 1911.

Source:

Women

100 metre freestyle 
Competed in Vaasa on 29 July 1911.

Source:

Water polo

Men 
Competed in Tampere.

Two matches were played:
 12 August 1911: Helsingfors Simsällskap–Turun Uimaseura 5–2 (0–1, 2–1, 3–0), after extra time
 13 August 1911: Helsingfors Simsällskap–Tampereen Uimaseura 9–0 (3–0, 6–0)
Second prize went to Turun Uimaseura.

Sources

References 

National swimming competitions
National championships in Finland
Swimming competitions in Finland
1911 in Finnish sport
1911 in water sports
Diving competitions in Finland
Water polo competitions